Coleophora fringillella is a moth of the family Coleophoridae. It is found in France, Italy, Austria, Hungary, Romania and Asia Minor.

References

External links
Lepiforum.de

fringillella
Moths described in 1839
Moths of Europe
Moths of Asia
Taxa named by Philipp Christoph Zeller